There are a number of political parties registered to the Electoral Commission in Wales. Some of these parties have elected representation in the Senedd (Welsh Parliament) and/or in Westminster (UK Parliament) and some have elected representation in one or more of the 22 Welsh local authorities, while others have entirely no elected representation. This Wikipedia page lists all of the above and some relevant Welsh political parties that formerly existed but have since disbanded. The largest political parties typically reside in either the House of Commons or the Senedd, the current largest party in Wales is Welsh Labour, followed closely by the Welsh Conservatives and Plaid Cymru.

House of Commons/Senedd

House of Commons 
The Parliament of the United Kingdom is a legislative body in the United Kingdom and creates primary legislation. There are two chambers within the Parliament of the United Kingdom: the House of Commons (the elected chamber) and the House of Lords. This article focuses on the House of Commons. Three parties have elected representatives in that house (MPs): Welsh Labour, Welsh Conservatives and Plaid Cymru. The constituencies are due to change for the 2024 general election.

Senedd
The Senedd was formed under the Government of Wales Act 1998, by the Labour government, following a referendum in 1997. It was given greater powers under the 2011 Welsh devolution referendum. In 2021, four parties have elected representatives in the Senedd: Welsh Labour, Welsh Conservatives, Plaid Cymru and Welsh Liberal Democrats.

House of Commons/Senedd parties

Local government
Several parties in Wales have no national representation, but have elected representation at the local government level.

County councils

Community and town councils

Council control

Parties with no elected representation

Notable registered parties

Defunct parties 
South Wales Socialist Society (1911–1920) - amalgamated with the Communist Party of Great Britain in the 1920s.
Communist Party of South Wales and the West of England (1920) - set up by those who opposed amalgamation with the Communist Party of Great Britain
Welsh Republican Movement (1949–1966) - most members either returned to Plaid Cymru or joined the Labour Party
Welsh Socialist Republican Movement (1979–1986) - succeeded as a political party in 1986 by Cymru Goch, however it still exists as a publication
Cymru Goch (1986–2003) - evolved into Forward Wales.
Democratic Alliance of Wales (1999–2008)

John Marek Independent Party (2003) - short lived party which became Forward Wales.
Forward Wales (2003–2010)
Blaenau Gwent People's Voice Group (2005–2010) - party set-up in Blaenau Gwent. Its leader, Dai Davies, retired from politics and the party disbanded.
Putting Llanelli First (2011–2016) - Siân Caiach (now a councillor for Gwlad) ran for the party in the Welsh Assembly seat of Llanelli in 2011 and 2016.
Respect - The Unity Coalition (2004–2016) - a party established by Salma Yaqoob and George Monbiot and built out of the Stop the War Coalition, its most notable candidate was George Galloway
Welsh Socialist Alliance (1999–2016) an alliance between the Socialist Party and Cymru Goch and some independents, which fell apart when the Socialist Party left the grouping

See also
 Elections in Wales
 Politics of Wales
 Electoral Commission (United Kingdom)
 List of political movements in Wales
 Political make-up of local councils in Wales
 Welsh devolution
 Welsh republicanism

Notes

References

Politics of Wales
Wales
Political parties